The LDV Pilot is a panel van that was produced by LDV Limited from 1996 until 2005, and closely based on preceding models dating back to the 1974 Leyland Sherpa (which were in turn related to older models).

The Pilot was available in capacities from 2.2 to 2.6 tonnes in a  load area. Power came from a 1.9 litre Peugeot diesel engine driving the rear wheels through a five speed gearbox. Access to the load area is from either the rear or a sliding side door.

History
Derived from the Morris/BMC J4 and JU250 vans of the 1960s, the core vehicle went through a series of developments, the main one being the revision of the forward control layout of the J4 and moving the engine ahead of the cab and accessible via a bonnet. This allowed the wheelbase to be extended resulting in greater stability, payload, side loading and the distinctive 'Sherpa' profile (though the last of the J4s and the first Sherpa are largely identical from the rear).

The Sherpa gave way to the Freight Rover 200 Series and in turn the Leyland DAF 200 Series before finally becoming the Pilot after LDV was formed in 1993. It was originally designed to be built on car production lines which led to it having a narrow track. This feature was made into a virtue in later publicity by stressing its ability in narrow city streets – this indeed was why the Sherpa series was for many years preferred over the Ford Transit by the Royal Mail, in particular.

Sherpa (1974–1982)

Originally developed by British Leyland the model was launched in 1974 under the nameplate Leyland Van. A year later the name of the model was changed to the Leyland Sherpa.  The Sherpa would then be branded as a Morris and later a Freight Rover.

The initial Sherpa line up consisted of vans in 185, 215 and 240 versions (where 185 denotes a GVW of 1.85 tons, and so on); pick ups in 215 and 240 versions; a 240 crewbus and minibus; and various chassis cab options in 220 and 250 versions. Payloads were quoted as 13/14cwt for the 185; 18/19cwt for the 215 and 220; and 22/23cwt for the 240 and 250.

In 1978 the 1.7 and 2.0 litre O series engines replaced the original 1622 cc and 1798 cc B series petrol units, while the 1798 cc B series diesel stayed put. The range was redesignated accordingly: vans: 200, 230 and 250; pick ups: 230 and 250; minibus and crewbus: 250 only; chassis cab: 255 only. A few months later, the Sherpa was rebadged as a Morris. In 1981, BL created the Freight Rover division as part of the Land Rover group, so the Sherpa's badges were changed again.

Sherpa K2 Series (1982–1984)

The short lived K2 Sherpa had a neater appearance and much improved side access to the load bay. The Sherpa van could now be bought in 200, 230, 250 and 280 versions. The crewbus and minibus continued in 250 form.

The original, integral pick up had now been dropped in favour of a dropside pick up built on the Sherpa chassis-cab. The 255 and 280 chassis cabs were also available on their own, ready to receive bespoke bodywork. Engine availability continued unaltered, with 1.7 and 2.0 litre O series petrol units, the 1.8 litre B series diesel and the option of a Landi-Hartog LPG conversion, first introduced at the launch of Freight Rover the year before. A 4WD Sherpa van was also now offered.

Freight Rover 200 Series (1984–1989)

With the next facelift, the Sherpa (now known as the Freight Rover 200 series) gained square headlamps, new bumpers and repositioned indicators. Alongside the original bodystyle there was new wide bodied variant (Freight Rover 300 Series). The 200 Series was initially available with a two tonne GVW.

The chassis cab also formed the basis for drop side pick ups, in 255, 280 and 285 versions, again available with either short or long wheelbases. Of course, the chassis cab could also be ordered on its own, again in a choice of lengths, so that bespoke bodywork could be fitted, with the added option of either single or double cabs. The 200 series continued to be offered as minibus or crewbus.

While the K2 Sherpa's engines remained available (including the ancient B series diesel), a 2.5 litre diesel unit was now offered on the 300 series. The B series diesel bowed out in November 1986 for the 200 series, being then replaced by the 2.0 NA direct injection Diesel Rover MDi / Perkins Prima, (as found in Maestros and in turbocharged form in Montegos and late Maestros (from 1992 to 1994)) which was effectively a dieselised BL O series engine.

This was a somewhat raucous, noisy and unrefined engine but was however a very reliable unit capable of excellent fuel economy, although the performance of the naturally aspirated engine was not a strong point. As a city van it was adequate but totally unsuitable for motorway work due to the noise levels.
At the same point, the O-series 1.7 and 2.0 Petrol engines were given an upgrade becoming the O2.

A low compression version of the Rover 3.5 litre V8 unit (taken from Land Rover) also became available on certain versions of the 300 Series (with a modified drivetrain) from 1986, producing . This version was designed for emergency services and express delivery operators, and was bought in large numbers by the police and ambulance services. Economy was very poor with this engine, with a claimed figure of only .

However, with the sale of Freight Rover in 1989, the Rover Group left this sector of the light commercial market.

Leyland DAF 200 Series (1989–1993)

With Freight Rover becoming Leyland DAF, the 200 Series was given a new radiator grille, bearing the Leyland DAF badge. The 200 Series continued to be built on car lines and its narrow width meant it became a very popular city van. The last 200s switched from the Perkins Prima engine to the less economical but more refined, naturally aspirated indirect injection PSA XUD 1.9L engine.

LDV 200 Series (1993–1996)

Following the sell off of the van business from the insolvent Leyland DAF in 1993, LDV Limited was formed.

LDV Pilot (1996–2005)

In 1996, the van received a facelift with less boxy front panels and a redesigned dashboard and seating and was renamed the Pilot. The facelift also saw the end of the '80s Rover stalks, but not the instruments and minor switchgear.

The van became popular as a minibus, and was available in pick up and fleet based vans, as well as being used by the army for transporting troops. Power arrived in the form of a Peugeot 1905cc diesel engine throughout the entire range, however it made the Pilot sluggish and only able to achieve  (One of the rare versions with the turbocharged version of this engine was an altogether more satisfying drive).

It also had little torque meaning most hills required the driver to change down. Early models have basic interiors consisting of two or three seats, Mountain Blue coloured plastic dashboard and LDV branded FM/AM cassette radio. Gears are selected using the now unpopular floor mounted gear stick. The van was also used by various police forces and the Royal Mail.

Turkish variant

A Sherpa derived van was also produced in Turkey by BMC Sanayi ve Ticaret A.S. as the BMC Levend, and as of 2006, a pick up derivative is also sold. This was not promoted in the United Kingdom.

Film appearance

A first generation Sherpa van made an appearance in the 1977 James Bond film The Spy Who Loved Me which was driven by the villainous Jaws (Richard Kiel) on a journey through the Sahara Desert, with Bond (Roger Moore) and his partner Anya Amasova (Barbara Bach) hiding in the back in their quest to recover a microfilm crucial to their mission.

They managed to escape in the vehicle after retrieving the microfilm but were unable to complete their journey due to the damage that Jaws had inflicted upon it in his earlier attempt to prevent them from escaping. In Billy Elliot movie there was a Leyland Sherpa (1984) which was given two stars by IMCDb.

Kit car
A short lived Sherpa 200 derived Kit Car produced by Sherpley Motors of Loughborough was manufactured briefly between 1997 and 2007, first being reported in Which Kit of October 1997.

The kit was engineered to loosely resemble a vintage Bentley. The early Speed Six design just used Sherpa axles and suspension, fitted to a custom chassis and mated to an engine of buyer's choice before being fitted with an Aluminium and fiberglass fabricated body; the later Speed Four model used the complete Sherpa 200 chassis and running gear (and occasionally engine) to enable it to pass the stricter SVA rules imposed after 1999.

The vehicle did not prove to be popular, and only 17 examples of the Sherpley were manufactured between these dates; the last one known to be sold still in kit form was advertised on eBay in 2013, prior to being sold privately for an undisclosed sum.

See also
LDV Limited
LDV Convoy
LDV Maxus

References

External links

The Sherpa family at the unofficial Austin/Rover resource site
The official performance LDV Pilot site and owners club
LDV website

Pilot
Vans

de:Leyland Sherpa